Walter Fritz Hansen (April 19, 1877 – November 8, 1965) was a Danish-born American politician who served as mayor of Boise, Idaho, from 1927 to 1929.

Hansen was appointed mayor to serve almost all of the two-year term of his predecessor Herbert F. Lemp, who died only four days after taking office.

Sources
Mayors of Boise - Past and Present
Idaho State Historical Society Reference Series, Corrected List of Mayors, 1867-1996

Mayors of Boise, Idaho
1877 births
1965 deaths
Danish emigrants to the United States